Knut Olof Lennart Eriksson (4 February 1939 – 1 September 2017) was a Swedish wrestler. At the 1969 World Championships he finished fourth in the unlimited-weight freestyle and won a bronze medal in the under 100 kg Greco-Roman contest. He competed in the light-heavyweight freestyle event at the 1964 Summer Olympics, but was eliminated in the second round by the eventual winner Aleksandr Medved.

References

1939 births
2017 deaths
Olympic wrestlers of Sweden
Wrestlers at the 1964 Summer Olympics
Swedish male sport wrestlers
World Wrestling Championships medalists
Sportspeople from Västerås
20th-century Swedish people
21st-century Swedish people